Brent McClanahan (born September 21, 1952 in Bakersfield, California) is a former professional American football player who played running back for seven seasons for the Minnesota Vikings. He is now a teacher at South High School in Bakersfield, CA.

Career

Brent McClanahan played for the Minnesota Vikings, until his retirement. His contract was cut short because of injuries. His jersey number was #33.

Personal life

Brent played football for Arizona State University prior to playing professionally.

Brent is now a Computer Applications teacher at his alma mater South High School and has two daughters and two sons that attended South High as well. One of his two sons, Brent II is currently living in California.

He has earned bachelor's degrees in agribusiness and business administration, and a masters in curriculum education. He earned his teaching credential from CSU Bakersfield.

He has been awarded the NFL Teacher of the Year and has been inducted into the Bob Elias Hall of Fame and the South High School Hall of Fame.

References

1952 births
Living people
Players of American football from Bakersfield, California
American football running backs
Minnesota Vikings players
Arizona State Sun Devils football players